Mike Mourant (born 21 July 1962) is a Canadian diver. He competed in the men's 3 metre springboard event at the 1984 Summer Olympics.

References

External links
 

1962 births
Living people
Canadian male divers
Olympic divers of Canada
Divers at the 1984 Summer Olympics
Divers from Winnipeg